The 1976 Gent–Wevelgem was the 38th edition of the Gent–Wevelgem cycle race and was held on 6 April 1976. The race started in Ghent and finished in Wevelgem. The race was won by Freddy Maertens of the Flandria team.

General classification

References

Gent–Wevelgem
1976 in road cycling
1976 in Belgian sport